Agelena maracandensis is a species of spider in the family Agelenidae, which contains at least 1,350 species . It was first described by Dmitry Charitonov in 1946 and is native to Central Asia.

References

maracandensis
Spiders described in 1946
Spiders of Central Asia